Facundo Colidio (born 4 January 2000) is an Argentine footballer who plays as a forward for Argentine Primera División club Tigre, on loan from Inter Milan.

Club career 
He made his professional debut on 5 October 2019, replacing Alexandre De Bruyn for the last 13 minutes of a 4–0 loss at K.V. Kortrijk in Belgian First Division A match.

On 4 January 2022, he was loaned to Tigre until 31 December 2022.

Personal life
Colidio also possesses an Italian passport.

References

External links

2000 births
Living people
People from Rafaela
Argentine footballers
Argentine expatriate footballers
Sportspeople from Santa Fe Province
Argentina under-20 international footballers
Argentina youth international footballers
Argentine people of Italian descent
Association football forwards
Inter Milan players
Belgian Pro League players
Argentine Primera División players
Sint-Truidense V.V. players
Club Atlético Tigre footballers
Expatriate footballers in Belgium
Argentine expatriate sportspeople in Belgium